Amursky (masculine), Amurskaya (feminine), or Amurskoye (neuter) may refer to:
Amursky District, a district of Khabarovsk Krai, Russia
Amursky (rural locality) (Amurskaya, Amurskoye), name of several rural localities in Russia
Amur Oblast (Amurskaya Oblast), a federal subject of Russia